Basil Khoury (born on 23 March 1883 in Marra, Syria - died on 21 November 1941) was Archbishop of the Melkite Greek Catholic Archeparchy of Homs in Syria.

Life

Basil Khoury succeed on November 20, 1920 Flavien Khoury as appointed Archbishop of Homs. The Patriarch of Antioch Demetrius I Qadi ordained him on 12 December 1920 bishop. With simultaneous appointment as Titular Archbishop of Sergiopolis he became on October 25, 1938 emeritus archbishop and was, until his death on November 21, 1941 Archbishop Emeritus of Homs. His successor was Athanasios Toutoungi.

References

External links
 http://www.catholic-hierarchy.org/bishop/bkhoub.html
 https://web.archive.org/web/20120419194326/http://www.pgc-lb.org/english/Church3.shtml#Homs

1883 births
1941 deaths
Melkite Greek Catholic bishops
Syrian archbishops
Eastern Catholic bishops in Syria